Stanley Redwine (born April 10, 1961) is a retired American middle-distance runner who matriculated at the University of Arkansas, and specialized in the 800 meters. He twice was the U.S. 800 meter national champion. He represented his country at three indoor World Championships finishing fourth each time. In addition, he won two bronze medals at the Pan American Games.

Redwine retired from competition in 1996, his 5th place at the Olympic Trials having failed to qualify for the Atlanta Olympics. He is the head coach at the University of Kansas where his men's and women's teams have won multiple conference championships. The 2013 women's team took the NCAA Outdoor Championships and he was named NCAA Women's Coach of the Year.

His personal bests (PR's) in the event are 1:44.87 outdoors (Oslo 1984) and 1:47.54 indoors (Budapest 1989). Other PR's were 400 meters in 46.07 (Austin, TX 1981), 500 meters  indoors in 1:02.17 (East Rutherford, NJ 1983) and 1000 meters in 2:20.43 (Rieti, Italy 1988).

Competition record

References

1961 births
Living people
American male middle-distance runners
African-American male track and field athletes
Pan American Games track and field athletes for the United States
Athletes (track and field) at the 1983 Pan American Games
Athletes (track and field) at the 1987 Pan American Games
Pan American Games bronze medalists for the United States
Pan American Games medalists in athletics (track and field)
World Athletics Championships athletes for the United States
Kansas Jayhawks track and field coaches
Arkansas Razorbacks men's track and field athletes
American track and field coaches
Goodwill Games medalists in athletics
Competitors at the 1986 Goodwill Games
Competitors at the 1994 Goodwill Games
Medalists at the 1983 Pan American Games
Medalists at the 1987 Pan American Games
21st-century African-American people
20th-century African-American sportspeople